The 2007 FIBA Americas Championship for Women was the qualifying tournament for FIBA Americas at the women's basketball tournament at the 2008 Summer Olympics in Beijing, China. The tournament was held in Valdivia, Chile from 26 – 30 September 2007.

Preliminary round 
Times given below are in Atlantic Standard Time Zone (UTC-4).

Group A

Group B

Knockout stage

Championship Bracket

5th place bracket

Classification rounds

Semifinals

Third place game

Final

Final standings

Olympic Qualification

As winner of the tournament the  gets direct entry into the 2008 Beijing Olympics.

The runner up  and the two teams that competed in the bronze medal game,  and  will get another chance through the FIBA Wildcard Tournament.

External links 
 

FIBA Women's AmeriCup
2007 in women's basketball
Bask
International women's basketball competitions hosted by Chile
2007–08 in North American basketball
2007–08 in South American basketball